Abigail "Fetch" Walker is a character from the Infamous video game series developed by Sucker Punch Productions and published by Sony Computer Entertainment. She first appears in 2014's Infamous Second Son as a supporting character, before appearing in the standalone prequel Infamous First Light released later that same year. Voiced by Laura Bailey, she is the third playable protagonist in the Infamous series, following Cole MacGrath and Delsin Rowe. She received mostly positive reviews from critics, with some expressing an opinion that she is a better character than Delsin.

Development 
The Infamous First Lights director Nate Fox said protagonist Fetch's "conflicted history and overall attitude made her the perfect fit for a standalone game." Sucker Punch felt that Fetch's powers were different enough from Second Sons Delsin's powers to warrant a separate game. Even though Fetch's different powers alone provided gameplay variety, during development, Sucker Punch ensured that they felt "fluid" and "very different". Another focus for Sucker Punch was to make the overall tone darker than Second Son. Sucker Punch put Fetch in plenty of harsh situations where she is forced to be herself and fight her way out.

During development, Sucker Punch placed a heavy emphasis on the characterization of protagonist Abigail "Fetch" Walker. Sucker Punch worked extensively with Fetch's voice actress Laura Bailey throughout the development of the game, often asking for her input in specific situations. Fox stated: "When it came time to put in dialogue or talk about motivations, we called Laura Bailey or texted her. She would tell me what would be Fetch's view so it was accurate to the character, but also accurate to a woman's experience." After the release of Second Son, Sucker Punch felt "compelled" to make a game about Fetch; Fox stated: "We made a game about Fetch because we liked Fetch." Players who pre-ordered the game received a bonus costume for protagonist Fetch called "D.U.P. Fetch".

Fictional biography 
Abigail "Fetch" Walker, a young conduit in the D.U.P.'s custody in their prison Curdun Cay, is ordered to give a demonstration of her powers to one Brooke Augustine by battling holographic foes created by fellow Conduit Eugene. Once that is done, Abigail is told to tell the events that led up to her arrest.

Abigail was one of the first of the new Conduits to emerge after The Beast's rampage across the countryside seven years ago. Despite her parents' best efforts, Abigail's parents were left with few options after she accidentally injured one of her classmates. Brent Walker, Abigail's older brother, grabbed her and ran away with her; the two turned to drug use to cope, but Brent eventually got clean, even hiding Abigail's stash to help her get clean as well. Brent also required Abigail to use her powers sparingly in order to avoid suspicion. Brent worked for gangs for years to save up enough money to buy a boat and cross the border from Seattle to Mexico.

Abigail survives thanks to her abilities and sets out to find Brent. Abigail soon meets Shane, an old acquaintance of Brent's and a small-time drug lord who is also on the lookout for Brent. Shane takes advantage of Abigail's naivete to use her to almost single-handedly defeat the Akurans in a gang war. When they finally locate Brent, Shane kidnaps him and forces Abigail to assist him in consolidating his control over Seattle's drug trade. In the present, Augustine speculates that Abigail's new abilities are a result of her coping with extreme trauma. Augustine allows Abigail to fight holograms of her "D.U.P. Troops" on the condition that she show her all of her abilities. Abigail's story continues after the latest challenges are completed.

Augustine reveals that she has known Abigail's story all along and has been working up the courage to murder her, revealing that she has Shane in custody and offers Abigail the chance to murder him. Abigail's "enthusiasm" leads her to blow a hole in the prison wall into the outside world after gladly accepting Augustine's offer. Despite the fact that Shane miraculously survives, battered and bruised, he flees by hijacking an APC with the D.U.P. and the now-freed Abigail hot on his tail. Abigail catches up to Shane and violently kills him, avenging her brother, with the D.U.P.'s unwilling assistance. Augustine declares that Abigail is'ready' after learning of Shane's execution.

Abigail is released into the Military's custody alongside Eugene and another Conduit named Hank Daughtry. Hank reveals he smuggled in a bent paper clip to use to pick their restraints, hijacking the truck, and crashing it at Salmon Bay during the drive. Abigail, Eugene, and the other conduits escape (except Hank, who remains trapped in the burning truck), while Delsin Rowe approaches the fire, setting the stage for the events of Second Son.

Reception 
Abigail "Fetch" Walker has received mostly positive reviews from critics. Time described Fetch as "relatable", noting that she is part of a wider trend of strong lead female characters in video games which began in the 2000s. Hamza Aziz of Destructoid and Dan Stapleton of IGN both praised the character and its power and claimed that the character is a "badass" and "better than Second Sons". Kimberly Wallace of GameInformer called the character "interesting". She further said that she "like Fetch because she's got moxie and isn't afraid to speak her mind or go with her gut." Wallace's colleague Andrew Reiner further opined that she was the most interesting character from The Second Son, and that she "stole the spotlight with her soulful story and down-to-earth demeanor". Reiner believed that she is a "fantastically written character", and rated the conclusion to her origin story in First Light highly. Jamie Trinca of VideoGamer praised Fetch for not being a generic male character who is tasked with saving the world; she instead a flawed anti-hero who has come to be defined by some extraordinarily bad decisions. Trinca found her "infinitely more interesting than Delsin Rowe”.

Kevin VanOrd of GameSpot called Fetch an "engaging heroine".  Daniel Bischoff of GameRevolution claimed that Fetch's neon powers were his favorite element in the game. Laura Francis of Eurogamer claimed that the neon-graffiti segments in the game felt like Fetch was "highly reminiscent of Jet Set Radio". In 2014, Andrew Webster of TheVerge claimed that the character was a PS4 female superhero. In his 2015 book Digital Character Development: Theory and Practice, Second Edition, Rob O'Neill opined that Sucker Punch set the high-bar for contemporary interactive characters in the video game industry with their animation work for Fetch. To him, her animations strike an appropriate balance between high quality graphics and consistent responsiveness to control inputs from the player.

References

Further reading

Action-adventure game characters
Female characters in video games
Female superheroes
Fictional characters who can manipulate light
Infamous (series)
Sony Interactive Entertainment protagonists
Video game characters introduced in 2014